Lake Garda (  or  ;) is the largest lake in Italy. It is a popular holiday location in northern Italy, about halfway between Brescia and Verona, and between Venice and Milan on the edge of the Dolomites. Glaciers formed this alpine region at the end of the last ice age. The lake and its shoreline are divided between the provinces of Brescia (to the south-west), Verona (south-east) and Trentino (north).

Etymology
In Roman times the lake was known as Benacus and by some it was revered as god Benacus, the personification of the lake, sometimes associated with the cult of Neptune. Today it is better known as Lake Garda, a toponym of Germanic origin attested since the Middle Ages and deriving from that of the homonymous town on the Veronese shore of the lake, which, together with another famous locality of the lake, Gardone Riviera, and others less known – such as Gàrdola, Gardoncino, Gardoni, Guàrdola and Le Garde – testifies the Germanic presence in the area that goes from the 6th to the 8th century AC, in particular, the Lombard one. The name Garda is evolved from the Germanic word warda, meaning "place of guard", "place of observation" or "place of safety".

The classic toponym of the lake, or Benācus lacus (Benaco), is almost certainly of Celtic origin, therefore prior to romanization, and should derive from bennacus, comparable with the Irish bennach, which means "horned". The term may derive from the many promontories of the lake.

Geography

Morphology and hydrography

The northern part of the lake is located in a depression that insinuates itself inside the Alps, while the southern part occupies an area of the upper Pianura Padana. The shape is typical of a moraine valley, probably having been formed under the action of a Paleolithic glacier. Although traces of the glacier's actions are evident today, in more recent years it has been hypothesised that the glacier occupied a previously existing depression, created by stream erosion 5 to 6 million years ago.

The eastern watershed of the Benacense basin has a direction parallel to the axis of the lake, while the western one has a more sinuous course. Within the basin, the major peaks are Presanella and Adamello.

To the south of Lake Garda, between Brescia, Mantua and Verona, a large morainic amphitheatre develops: a succession of hilly circles with small flat areas interposed, in some cases marshy, originated thanks to the transport and storage action of the great Garda glacier. These morainic deposits were formed during the glaciations Günz, Mindel, Riss and Würm: very limited morainic deposits are attributed to the two oldest, Günz and Mindel, while the outer morainic circles are attributed to the Riss glaciation and the inner ones to the Würm glaciation. The morphology of the hills is gentle and with delicate lines; from the highest points, it is possible to perceive the relationships that link the hills to the mountains as well as the circular amphitheatre shape of the hills, which seem to embrace the southern part of the lake.  

The main tributary of Lake Garda is the Sarca River, others include the Ponale River (fed by Lago di Ledro), the Varone/Magnone River (via the Cascate del Varone) and various streams from both mountainsides, while the only outlet is the Mincio River (at Peschiera). The subdivision is created by the presence of a fault submerged between Sirmione and Punta San Vigilio which is almost a natural barrier that hampers the homogenization between the water of the two zones.

If the water level of the Adige river is excessive, water is diverted to the lake through the Mori-Torbole tunnel.

Geology

Lake Garda area is considered one of the most seismic in Italy. The oldest known earthquake that struck the Garda region seems to have occurred in 243 (or perhaps 245): it was so disastrous that the city of Benaco, located where Toscolano Maderno stands today, suddenly disappeared. The disappearance of the town is probably due to the cracking and landslide of the mountain above Toscolano, which caused the flooding of a small lake enclosed by the mountains, whose waters submerged the populous town. 

In 1866 a rather long period of seismic agitation began in Baldo area, with earthquakes of varying intensity, tremors, shaking and other phenomena of lesser importance, which saw as the most important event the earthquake of 5 January 1892, which shook the entire Garda region with extraordinary violence, causing the fall of chimneys and walls. 

Other earthquakes more recently hit Salò and its surroundings, in particular the earthquake of 31 October 1901 caused widespread damage to buildings, some collapses and cracks in the ground, while another earthquake in 2004 caused damage to some buildings.

Islands
The lake has also numerous small islands and five main ones, the largest being Isola del Garda. Nearby to the south is San Biagio island, also known as the Isola dei Conigli ("Island of the Rabbits"). Both are offshore of San Felice del Benaco, on the lake's western side. The three other main islands are Isola dell'Olivo, Isola di Sogno, and Isola di Trimelone, all farther north near the eastern side.

Climate

The particularly mild climate favours the growth of some hardy Mediterranean plants, including the olive tree, parasol pine, mediterranean cypress, chinese windmill palm and Canary Island Date Palm. Some hardy citrus trees, such as hardy lemons and satsuma can also be found, which are extremely rare at this latitude (46° North). In ancient times, poets like Catullus wrote about "Lacus Benacus" with its mild climate vivified by the winds. The lake is oriented from north to south towards the Po Valley, so many winds typical of the lake are the result of a difference between lower and higher altitude temperatures. Due to this, winds are generated that descend from the mountains to the plains in the morning and go back to the mountains in the afternoon. The bottleneck formed by the lake basin affects the timing of the winds, many of which happen on a regular daily basis. The winds are all named, most in regional Italian dialect so a single wind may have different names.

Fauna and flora
Lake Garda is rich in biodiversity. Salmo carpio, also known as the carpione (carpione del Garda or Lake Garda carpione) is a rare salmonid fish endemic to Lake Garda. It has been introduced to a number of other lakes in Italy and elsewhere but unsuccessfully in all cases. The population in Lake Garda has been strongly declining, and is considered critically endangered (IUCN 3.1). The main threats are due to overfishing, pollution and possibly competition from introduced species such as Coregonus and other Salmonidae.

Adult lake trout outside the mating season are silvery with very few black spots on the body and almost none on the head. During the mating season, some males develop a dark mottled body colouration. They feed on zooplankton and bottom-dwelling crustaceans in summer. Males and females reach sexual maturity at two or three years. The mating takes place every one to two years. The spawning takes place in  depth in the vicinity of underwater springs. The maximum age is five years.

Areas around Lake Garda, inhabited since prehistoric times, are an environment of great naturalistic value, with vegetation typical of the Mediterranean climate such as olive trees, vines, lemon trees, agave and other plants, which thrive thanks to the microclimate created by the Garda basin, which makes winter particularly mild. During the spring wildflowers such as primroses, iris, violets and red lilies are born, while in summer some bloom varieties of wild orchids. Thanks to the presence of protected areas, hares and small wild mammals, water birds and birds of prey survive, while ponds and ditches are populated by pike, carpe and eels. The herds of cattle, horses and other domestic animals give a bucolic aspect to the hilly landscape.

History 
Traces of human presence around the lake have been found related to the Middle Paleolithic, in particular flint tools, but only above certain altitudes, as at lower altitudes the actions of the glaciers have canceled all the clues that could have proved the presence of man. There are some signs of encampments from Upper Paleolithic, in particular on the slopes of Monte Baldo and Stivo. In the Neolithic the populations that inhabited the lake came into contact with the square-mouthed vases culture, as evidenced by the objects accompanying some tombs from this period found near Arco.

Bronze and Iron ages
The greatest evidence of human presence in prehistoric times dates back to the Bronze Age, when numerous aggregates of stilt houses arose in the lower lake before being abandoned during the Iron Age in favor of more strategic points. Lake Garda was a meeting point between the populations of Reti and Veneti, whose presence is testified in particular by the necropolis of Garda, as well as that of the Etruscans who came to trade in these areas. Also plausible is the presence of the Cenomani, who would have settled in the area between Brescia and the lake around the 6th century BC, leaving their traces mostly in the Lombard toponymy.

Roman times

The integration between Romans and Cenomani, who controlled the Garda area, probably began in 225 BC, when there was a treaty of alliance between Cenomani, Veneti and Romans, even if the actual Romanization of the territory took place between the 2nd and 1st centuries BC. In 89 BC the rights of Latin cities were granted to the Garda areas by the will of the Roman consul Gnaeus Pompeius Strabo, while forty years later Roman citizenship was finally granted to Brixia (whose countryside included the western and northern banks of the Benaco) and Verona (which instead included the eastern shore). During 1st century AD many roads were built, such as the via Gallica, which connected Verona to Milan passing through Peschiera (the ancient Arilica), and the via Claudia Augusta, which connected the plain with the Resia pass and therefore the northernmost territories, as well as some minor roads that connected the Adige valley with the Garda. Two pagi were also established: pagus Benacenses on Brescia and pagus Claudienses on Verona. 

In 268 AD the Battle of Lake Benacus was fought between the army of the Roman Empire, commanded by the future emperor Claudius Gothicus, and the German federation of the Alamanni. The overwhelming victory obtained by the Romans allowed the expulsion of Alemanni from northern Italy, due to the very serious losses they suffered during the battle. 

The Roman presence is amply testified also by settlements, villas (in particular the notes Grottoes of Catullus), by the remains of centuriation still visible today, by the remains of a sanctuaries, tombstones and epigraphic testimonies.

Middle Ages

In the Middle Ages Lake Garda was described by Dante in his Divine Comedy:

After the collapse of the Roman Empire, the Garda region witnessed the passage of numerous Germanic populations, but the first one that settled there, after a long migration, was that of the Lombards. Their testimonies are mostly present along the southern and eastern shores, preferred to other areas due to their strategic importance: from here it was possible to control both the waterways of Garda and Mincio, and the Adige valley. During the Lombard hegemony there was a first administrative reorganization, as well as the definitive Christianization of the area, begun in the previous centuries by Vigilius of Trent and Zeno of Verona. The lake remained on the border between three powerful Lombard duchies: Brescia, Verona and Trento and Brescia. 

The first documents that testify the presence of a Fines Gardenses, an entity with its own officials for the administration of justice, even if not autonomous with respect to the Count of Verona, date back to 825, while after the year 1000 county of Garda was established by the emperor Henry II. Starting from the 11th century, towns around the lake began to develop a differentiated policy compared to that of the major centers of influence – Brescia, Verona and Trento – and this greater autonomy meant that many centers became free communities. These possessed comfortable economic conditions compared to the inland countries and a strong social awareness and sense of community. 

In the 13th century, however, the Signoria Scaligera was established and it soon subdued the eastern shore of the lake. The Scaliger built numerous defensive constructions, in particular they built the castles of Sirmione, Malcesine and Riva, reinforced the port structures of Lazise and Torri del Benaco, and built a great defense system called Serraglio, the only one of its kind in Italy. This fortified system, completed by Cangrande II in 1355, included isolated castles in Ponti sul Mincio and Monzambano, a serious continuous and uninterrupted castles and towers connected by defensive walls starting from the fortress of Valeggio sul Mincio and then continuing up to Nogarole Rocca. The Seraglio remained practically intact until the mid-19th century, when it was partially dismantled.

Early modern history
In 1387, following the defeat of Antonio della Scala, the whole Garda area was subjected to the Visconti; as early as 1405 the eastern shore passed into the hands of the Republic of Venice, while the western shore remained afflicted by the struggles between Guelphs and Ghibellines. In 1426 the Visconti lost Brescia and the western shore of the lake, which thus passed into the hands of Venice: gathered under the flag of the Republic of Venice, the 34 Benacense municipalities they obtained ample autonomy. The war returned in 1438, due to the struggle between Venice and  Milan: an exceptional event, remembered with the name of Galeas per montes, was the passage of a fleet composed of six galleys and twenty-five ships on the slopes of Monte Baldo, pulled by 2,000 oxen. This fleet sailed on Adige and almost reached Rovereto, from where it was transported to Lake Garda by land through the valley of Lake Loppio. The fleet was then used to counter the Milanese one and had its greatest success in a battle at Riva del Garda, which was followed by the capitulation of the city. 

In 1508 the League of Cambrai was formed against the Serenissima: Venice strengthened the castles of its mainland domains, including those of Salò and Padenghe, and sent several galleys to the lake, as well as having new ones built directly on Lake Garda. During the war the Venetians lost part of their domains which were however recovered in 1512. In 1516 emperor Maximilian I came to Italy and the lake returned to German hands again, allowing the Serenissima to recover the lost territories. 

In 1796 the territories of the Serenissima were involved in the Napoleonic wars: at the end of May the French advanced to the lake and defeated the Austrians at Borghetto sul Mincio, conquering Peschiera. At the end of July the French were defeated and had to retreat beyond Salò, which was then occupied by the Austrians. Numerous clashes took place between the adversaries on the battlefield of Lake Garda. In 1797 the French occupied Mantua, while Brescia valleys and towns on the lake rose up against the Napoleonic forces, even if the Republic of Venice maintained its neutral status and did not send aid to rescue. The Veronese, on the other hand, autonomously organized expeditions against the centers occupied by the French, but were defeated and forced to retreat to Verona, where on 17 April the anti-French insurrections called "Pasque Veronesi" (Pasque Veronesi) began. ". On 17 October the Treaty of Campoformio was signed: the south-western shores went to the French, while the north-eastern ones went to the Austrians. In 1799 the war continued until the following year the lake returned to French hands: it became part of the Cisalpine Republic (later transformed into Italian Republic and then again in Kingdom of Italy, always under French control.

In 1815 following the definitive defeat of Napoleon Bonaparte, during the Congress of Vienna it was decided to create the Kingdom of Lombardy–Venetia: in this way the whole Garda region returned to Austrian hands.

Later modern and contemporary history

The First Italian War of Independence saw an initial slow advance of the Piedmontese army towards the lake: at the news of its approach, Salò rebelled against the Austrians, several soldiers were taken prisoner and the Austrian insignia demolished. During the events also Riva del Garda and several towns on the Veronese side rose up. The Austrian army was forced to retreat to the Mincio line due to the advance of the Piedmontese troops and on 4 April the Austrians were driven out of Lonato and Desenzano, while the Piedmontese attempt to conquer Peschiera was unsuccessful. After the  Piedmontese defeat of Custoza the pre-war status quo restored. In 1859 the  Second War of Independence began; on 18 June the Hunters of the Alps managed to enter Salò, from where Giuseppe Garibaldi wanted to leave to continue the advance towards Veneto crossing the lake with some boats, but new orders forced him to move the troops in the Brescia valleys. However the Italian troops managed to sink an Austrian steamship before leaving Salò. Shortly after the battle of Solferino and San Martino was won by the Franco-Savoyards and Peschiera was besieged. With the armistice of Villafranca the war was put to an end: Garda returned to be a land border, on this occasion between Italians and Austrians. During the Third War of Independence Garibaldi returned to Salò again and from there he invaded Trentino. Meanwhile, the Austrians repeatedly bombed Gargnano and tried to impose their dominance. Despite the humiliating Italian defeat, in 1866 Veneto was finally handed over to the Kingdom of Italy, except for the northern part of the lake which still remained under Austrian control. 

During the First World War towns on Lake Garda were bombed several times. On 23 July 1915 the first aerial bombardment took place in the area, when Riva del Garda was hit. The steamers of the lake were requisitioned by the Italian army and were re-equipped as warships. The following year some guns and artillery batteries were installed, but on 20 February 1916 Riva was hit again. The following day three Austrian planes bombed Desenzano, while on 27 February bombs fell in Nago and Torbole. In 1918 Riva was bombed again. Later Limone and, once again, Riva were targeted, but with the end of the war Trentino also passed into Italian hands. 

In the period between the two wars the poet Gabriele D'Annunzio settled in Gardone Riviera, where the "Vittoriale degli Italiani", his residence and now a museum, would later be built. 

Until 1943 the events of Second World War did not particularly affect the lake region, but following the birth of the Italian Social Republic the German command settled in Limone and, on 10 October, that of Benito Mussolini in Gargnano. The Ministry of Defense was located in Desenzano; the Ministry of Foreign Affairs, the Ministry of Popular Culture and the press agencies settled in Salò, which became the capital of the newborn German puppet republic. Fasano was the seat of the German embassy and Gardone of the Japanese one, while the Ministry of the Interior and the seat of the Republican Fascist Party (PFR) found accommodation in Maderno. The upper part of the lake was also occupied militarily by the Wehrmacht. In April 1945 the lake was freed by the Allies and later became part of the Republic of Italy.

Myth and Legend 
According to the Greco-Roman mythology, the River Mincius was the child of the Lake Benacus.

In ancient German Sagas, Garda was home to Ortnit.

Towns and villages on the lake 
Around Lake Garda there are 26 comuni, the most populated being Desenzano del Garda (29,179 inhabitants), followed by Arco (17,857) and Riva del Garda (17,518).

Economy

Tourism

Garda's economy is based on tourism. Back to Roman times, especially from the early imperial age, magnificent villas were present on the shores of the lake, conceived as places dedicated to otium, an activity actually reserved for the ruling classes. In particular Sirmione was a privileged place for the presence of sulphurous springs that allowed a thermal use. Starting from the Renaissance the lake returned to be populated with noble villas.

Tourism in the modern conception of the term, however, developed from the end of the 19th century, even if it was still an élite tourism that concerned almost exclusively the north-western area of the lake. One of the first tourist resorts was Gardone Riviera, where the first small hotel was built. Expanded over time, it became one of the buildings that made up the luxurious Grand Hotel Gardone Riviera. In its vicinity other small hotels and villas slowly arose and, after the poet Gabriele D'Annunzio had the Vittoriale degli Italiani built here, the fame of the place grew further. 

On the Veronese shore, tourism arrived much later, around the 1930s, when the current Strada Gardesana Orientale was built along the shores of the lake. With the arrival of tourists, "lakeside promenades" were planned. From the 1950s tourism has undergone a sort of transformation: tourism with a long stay has been accompanied by "hit and run" tourism, with a short stop, just for the weekend or even for a few hours. The first is fed by tourists who want to spend their holidays on the lake, coming from different areas (in addition to Italians, numerous Germans, French, Swiss and Dutch), while the second is fed by those who live a short distance from the lake and who want to spend a few hours there. Both types of tourism have caused notable changes in the organization of the territory and of the inhabited centers. 

Furthermore, in the second half of the 20th century, a real entertainment industry was formed along Lake Garda as a series of parks were built. The most important is Gardaland, the biggest Italian theme park which hosts numerous tourist attractions.

Lake Garda is also a popular destination for sport tourism. Riva, Torbole and Campione are famous for winds that attract people who practice sail, windsurf and kiteboard.

Transport

Ferries 

A daily ferry service connects major towns on the eastern and western shores of Lake Garda. The service runs from Desenzano del Garda to Riva del Garda, via Peschiera del Garda, Salò and Malcesine.

Railway 
The region can be reached directly via the Milan-Venice railway, with Desenzano-Sirmione and Peschiera railway station.

Buses 

Buses are faster alternatives to ferry services. On the eastern coast, ATV (Verona Transport Company) provides at least five daily bus routes between Verona and Garda, with one route extending to Riva del Garda. Trentino Transporti provides daily bus routes between Riva del Garda and Rovereto or Trento. On western coast, SAIA (Brescia Mobilità) provides regular bus services between Desenzano del Garda, Salò, Gargnano and Brescia.

Highways
The lake is located at the center of a crucial node between. Brescia, Verona and Trento, and is therefore easily reachable via the transversal infrastructures of the Po Valley and those of the Brenner-Rome axis:

Roads
Lake Garda is also served by a road network that runs along the entire lake and is made up of the following infrastructures:
 State Highway 11 Padana Superiore, from Desenzano del Garda to Peschiera del Garda
 State Highway 45bis Gardesana Occidentale, from Salò to Riva del Garda
 State Highway 249 Gardesana Orientale, from Peschiera del Garda to Riva del Garda
 State Highway 572 di Salò, from Desenzano del Garda to Salò

Panoramas

See also 
 Sirmio
Rocca di Manerba del Garda

References

External links 

 VisitGarda is the official website for the promotion of tourism of Lake Garda.
 Gardalombardia is the official website for the promotion of tourism of the western coast of Lake Garda.
 Brescia Tourism is the official tourism board website of Brescia and Garda Lake.
 

 Discovering Lake Garda – official Blog lake Garda Trentino 
Tourist Information Lake Garda

 
Garda
Garda
Garda
Waterways of Italy
Garda
Province of Brescia
Province of Verona
Garda Mountains